Tam Hopkins (born March 22, 1978) is a former American football guard who played in the National Football League for one season. Hopkins also played for the NFL Europe's Cologne Centurions for one season. He played college football at Ohio State.

References

External links
 Pro Football Archives bio

1978 births
Living people
Sportspeople from Winter Park, Florida
Players of American football from Florida
American football offensive guards
Ohio State Buckeyes football players
New York Giants players
Cologne Centurions (NFL Europe) players